James McCourt (born July 4, 1941) is a gay American-born writer and novelist who was raised in Jackson Heights, Queens. McCourt has been with his life partner, novelist Vincent Virga, since 1964  after they met at Yale University as graduate students in the Yale School of Drama. McCourt's and Virga's papers are held at Yale's Beinecke Rare Book & Manuscript Library.

Work

McCourt is best known for his extravagant novel Mawrdew Czgowchwz (1975), about a fictional opera diva, and his 2003 nonfiction book Queer Street, about gay life in New York City after World War II.  His novel, Now Voyagers (2007), is the first in a series of projected sequels to Mawrdew Czgowchwz.

Acclaim
McCourt has garnered praise from critics Susan Sontag and Harold Bloom and has recently been championed by author Dennis Cooper. Sontag directed McCourt's first novel, Mawrdew Czgowchwz, to her publisher's attention, while Bloom named a later work, Time Remaining to his influential Western Canon. Mawrdew Czgowchwz was brought back in print in 2002 with a new introduction by Wayne Koestenbaum.

Bibliography
Fiction
 Mawrdew Czgowchwz (Farrar, Straus & Giroux, 1975)
 Kaye Wayfaring in "Avenged" (stories) (Viking, 1985)
 Time Remaining (stories) (Knopf, 1993)
 Delancey's Way (Knopf, 2000)
 Wayfaring at Waverly in Silverlake (stories) (Knopf, 2002)
 Now Voyagers (Turtle Point Press, 2008)

Nonfiction
 Queer Street: Rise and Fall of an American Culture, 1947-1985 (W. W. Norton, 2003)
 Lasting City: The Anatomy of Nostalgia (Liveright Publishing Corporation, 2013)

Shorter writings
 “Come Back, Harry Fannin!” Review of Contemporary Fiction 10.2 (Summer 1990): 184-86.
 “Introduction.” Severo Sarduy, “Cobra” and “Maitreya.” Normal: Dalkey Archive Press, 1995, pp. xi-xviii.
 “Not Some Brainless Beauty” [book review of Faye Dunaway’s Looking for Gatsby]. New York Times Book Review, 10 December 1995, p. 39.
 “Prima Donna” [book review of Kim Chernin’s Cecilia Bartoli]. New York Times Book Review, 16 March 1997, p. 16.
 “The Actors Who Reflect the Stars.” New York Times, 23 March 2003, sec. 4, p. 13. [On best-supporting actor award]
 "Riding Shotgun with the Almighty." Los Angeles Times Book Review, 2 October 2005. [book review of Dennis Cooper's God Jr.} 
 "The Canticle of Skoozle." Triple Canopy no. 14 (13 September 2011).
 [On semicolons]. Apology no. 1 (Winter 2013): 133-35.
 “Vissi d’Arte (The Memoirs of Morgana Neri, As Confided to ‘Oroviso’).” Pleasure: A Journal of the Arts, September 2015, pp.  37-58.

References

Further reading
Hoffman, William Moses. "The Interior Landscape of James McCourt." Los Angeles Times Magazine, 31 October 1993, PP. 30–34.
Moore, Steven. "James McCourt." My Back Pages: Reviews and Essays (LA: Zerogram Press), 2017, pp. 239–42.
------. * L.A. Times review of Now Voyagers
Rollow, David. "'That was Czgowchwz, her story, history': The Fictions of James McCourt." Hollins Critic 45.2 (April 2008): 2-27.

External links

Critical
 Interview in Publishers Weekly about Now Voyagers
 A Diva Cruises Again New York Times review of Now Voyagers
 The Seven Godlike Books of James McCourt feature on Dennis Cooper's blog

Interviews
 Bookworm: James McCourt interview on KCRW (1993)

1941 births
Living people
20th-century American novelists
21st-century American novelists
American male novelists
American gay writers
American LGBT novelists
20th-century American male writers
21st-century American male writers